One Nation, One King is a 2018 French film written and directed by Pierre Schoeller. It stars Adèle Haenel, Gaspard Ulliel, Laurent Lafitte and Louis Garrel, and shows the French Revolution in Paris from the storming of the Bastille to the execution of the King. The film made its world premiere out of competition at the 75th Venice International Film Festival on 7 September 2018. It was released in France by StudioCanal on 26 September 2018.

Plot 
The film is a historical fresco dealing with the French Revolution, especially the first years of the period (1789-1793), and notably focusing on the role and the perception of the contemporaries of King Louis XVI in the tumult which engulfed France at the end of the Ancien Régime. The film looks at a number of historic figures of the time, such as Robespierre, Marat, Desmoulins and Danton, in the Estates General, the National Constituent Assembly, and finally the National Convention.

Cast 
 Gaspard Ulliel as Basile
 Louis Garrel as Maximilien de Robespierre
 Adèle Haenel as Françoise Candole
 Céline Sallette as Reine Audu
 Laurent Lafitte as le roi Louis XVI
 Ruggero Barbera as le Dauphin Louis Charles 
 Maëlia Gentil as la reine Marie-Antoinette
 Denis Lavant as Jean-Paul Marat
 Niels Schneider as Louis Antoine de Saint-Just
 Izïa Higelin as Margot Laforce
 Olivier Gourmet as Louis-Joseph Henri, dit « l’Oncle ».
 Noémie Lvovsky as Solange, épouse de l’Oncle
 Andrzej Chyra as Claude François Lazowski
 Johan Libéreau as Tonin
 Audrey Bonnet as femme Landelle
 Thibaut Evrard as Stanislas-Marie Maillard
 Jean-Marc Roulot as sectionnaire Lechenard
 Grégory Gatignol as Clément l’Effaré
 Cosme Castro as un patriote lors de la prise de la Bastille
 Vincent Deniard as Georges Jacques Danton
 Jean-Charles Clichet as Jérôme Pétion de Villeneuve
 Julia Artamonov as Pauline Léon
 Patrick Hauthier as François Henri, comte de Virieu
 Philippe Chaine as Jean-Denis Lanjuinais
 Rodolphe Congé as Emmanuel-Joseph Sieyès
 Jean-Pierre Duret as Gamon
 Guillaume Marquet as Jean-Joseph Mounier, président de l’Assemblée
 Pierre-François Garel as Antoine Barnave
 John Arnold as Nicolas de Condorcet
 Jacques Ledran as Jacques Guillaume Thouret
 Etienne Beydon as Camille Desmoulins
 Grégoire Tachnakian as Antoine-François Momoro
 Thibault Lacroix as Charles Varlet
 Frédéric Norbert as César-Guillaume de La Luzerne, évêque de Langres
 Serge Merlin as Louis XI dans le cauchemar de Louis XVI
 Patrick Préjean as Henry IV of France dans le cauchemar de Louis XVI
 Louis-Do de Lencquesaing as Louis XIV dans le cauchemar de Louis XVI
 Jacques Lacaze as Bertrand Barère

Release and reception 
The film premiered out of competition at the 75th Venice International Film Festival on 7 September 2018. It was the opening film of the 8th Festival de l'Ecrit à l'écran, and was screened at the 2018 23rd Busan International Film Festival.

Accolades 
 Festival du film politique de Porto-Vecchio 2018 : Jury des médias
 44th César Awards
 Nominated – César Award for Best Costume Design for Anaïs Romand
 Nominated – César Award for Best Production Design for Thierry François

References

External links 
 
 
 Relire la Révolution française : Grand entretien avec Pierre Schoeller, interview with Pierre Schoeller and Emmanuel Laurentin in Fabrique de l'histoire for France Culture 24 September 2018.

2018 films
2010s French films
French historical films
French historical drama films
French Revolution films
Belgian historical films
Belgian historical drama films